Matz Sandman (born 19 January 1948) is a Norwegian politician for the Labour Party. He was Minister of Family and Consumer Affairs 1990–1991, and Minister of Children and Family Affairs in 1991. He earned a degree in economics from the Norwegian School of Economics and Business Administration.

References

1948 births
Living people
Ministers of Children, Equality and Social Inclusion of Norway
Ministers for children, young people and families